"I'm Not Shy" is the only single from English girl group Frank, released in the UK on 31 July 2006. It was made available on CD and digital download. It was later included on Frank's only album, Devil's Got Your Gold.

"I'm Not Shy" was originally recorded by Mania, an act formed from part of the Xenomania songwriting team, and appeared on an album sampler leaked to the internet. The song has since been used by Pett Productions in the television series Tittybangbang.

Track listing
CD
"I'm Not Shy"
"Mr Beautiful" (non-album track)

Video
The video was directed by British director Phil Griffin, and features the girls on photos that are being reproduced in an old fashioned dark room, showing them dressed up in the style of the 1930s and 1940s.

Chart positions
UK Singles Chart: number 40
Irish Singles Chart: number 66

References

2006 songs
2006 debut singles
Song recordings produced by Xenomania
Songs written by Brian Higgins (producer)
Songs written by Miranda Cooper
Songs written by Niara Scarlett